Beck – Okänd avsändare (English: Beck – Sender Unknown) is a 2002 film about the Swedish police detective Martin Beck directed by Harald Hamrell.

Cast 
 Peter Haber as Martin Beck
 Mikael Persbrandt as Gunvald Larsson
 Malin Birgerson as Alice Levander
 Marie Göranzon as Margareta Oberg
 Rebecka Hemse as Inger
 Mårten Klingberg as Nick 
 Peter Hüttner as Oljelund
 Gustaf Hammarsten as Klas Duvander 
 Ingvar Hirdwall as Valdemar, Martin Beck's neighbour
 Michael Flessas as Jurij Rostoff
 Annika Hallin as Mamman

References

External links 

2000s Swedish-language films
Martin Beck films
2002 television films
2002 films
2000s crime films
Films directed by Harald Hamrell
2000s police procedural films
2000s Swedish films